Raymond Bunt, Jr. (born May 19, 1944) is a former Republican member of the Pennsylvania House of Representatives.

He is a 1962 graduate of Schwenksville High School. He attended Ursinus College and Pennsylvania State University.

He was first elected to represent the 147th legislative district in the Pennsylvania House of Representatives in 1982. He retired prior to the 2006 elections.

References

External links
 official PA House profile (archived)

1944 births
Living people
Republican Party members of the Pennsylvania House of Representatives
People from Aguadilla, Puerto Rico
Pennsylvania State University alumni
Ursinus College alumni